Phrontis alba, common name the variable dog whelk, is a species of sea snail, a marine gastropod mollusk in the family Nassariidae, the Nassa mud snails or dog whelks.

The variety Nassarius albus var. nanus Nowell-Usticke, 1959 is a synonym of Phrontis karinae Nowell-Usticke, 1971

Description
The length of the shell varies between 6 mm and 13 mm.

Distribution
This species occurs in the Gulf of Mexico, the Caribbean Sea, the Lesser Antilles; in the Atlantic Ocean from North Carolina, USA to Brazil.

References

 Cernohorsky W. O. (1984). Systematics of the family Nassariidae (Mollusca: Gastropoda). Bulletin of the Auckland Institute and Museum 14: 1–356. 
 Rosenberg, G., F. Moretzsohn, and E. F. García. 2009. Gastropoda (Mollusca) of the Gulf of Mexico, Pp. 579–699 in Felder, D.L. and D.K. Camp (eds.), Gulf of Mexico–Origins, Waters, and Biota. Biodiversity. Texas A&M Press, College Station, Texas.
 Petuch E.J. & Myers R.F. (2014). Molluscan communities of the Florida Keys and adjacent areas. Their ecology and biodiversity. CRC Press, Boca Raton. 300 pp. 
 Galindo L.A., Puillandre N., Utge J., Lozouet P. & Bouchet P. (2016). The phylogeny and systematics of the Nassariidae revisited (Gastropoda, Buccinoidea). Molecular Phylogenetics and Evolution. 99: 337-353

External links

 

Nassariidae
Gastropods described in 1826